Alto Paraíso is a municipality located in the Brazilian state of Rondônia. Its population was 21,847 (2020) and its area is 2,652 km².

References

Municipalities in Rondônia